Vânjuleţ is a commune located in Mehedinți County, Oltenia, Romania. It is composed of two villages, Hotărani and Vânjuleț.

References

Communes in Mehedinți County
Localities in Oltenia